The Intermediate League World Series West Region is one of five United States regions that currently sends teams to the Intermediate League World Series in Livermore, California. The region's participation in the ILWS dates back to 2013.

West Region states

 (Northern)
 (Southern)

Region champions
As of the 2022 Intermediate League World Series.

Results by state
As of the 2022 Intermediate League World Series.

See also
Big League World Series (West Region)
Junior League World Series (West Region)
Little League World Series 1957–2000 (West Region)
Little League World Series (Northwest Region)
Little League World Series (West Region)
Senior League World Series (West Region)

References

Intermediate League World Series
West
Baseball competitions in the United States